Agawa (written: 阿川) is a Japanese surname. Notable people with the surname include:

, Japanese writer
, Japanese lawyer, diplomat, academic and writer
, Japanese writer and television personality

Japanese-language surnames